A solubility chart is a chart describing, for different combinations of cations and anions, whether the ionic compounds formed dissolve in or precipitate from a solution.

The following chart shows the solubility of various common ionic compounds in water, at a pressure of 1 atm and under room temperature (approx. ). Boxes that read "soluble" indicate the formation of an aqueous product containing no precipitate, while "slightly soluble" and "insoluble" markings mean that a solid precipitate will form; "slightly soluble" compounds such as calcium sulfate may require heat to form precipitates. For more detailed information on the exact solubility of compounds, see the solubility table.

For compounds with multiple hydrates, the solubility of the most soluble hydrate is shown in this chart.

Some compounds, such as nickel oxalate, will not precipitate immediately even though they are insoluble, requiring a few minutes to precipitate out.

See also
Solubility rules

Notes

References 

Solutions